Che' Puan Juliana Sophie binti Johari Evans (born July 5, 1989) is a Malaysian actress, TV personality, MC, and model. She is of Malays,British and American descent. She made a television appearance at the age of 12 years as a host. She then hosted Remaja, a popular program on TV3. 

In 2020, she was appointed as a Tourism Ambassador for the #PusingSelangorDulu Campaign by the Selangor State Government and the Selangor Ministry of Tourism.

Early life and education

She was born on 5 July 1989 in Shah Alam, Selangor. Her father is of British and American descent and her mother is of Malays descent. She is the youngest of three siblings. 

At the age of 15, she also represented the state of Selangor in the Artistic Gymnastics event at the national level sports event organized by the Malaysian School Sports Council (MSSC).

She graduated with a Bachelor's Degree in Mass Communication with Honours from Sunway University in Selangor. 

In 2012, she continued her studies at Western Michigan University, in Kalamazoo, Michigan USA and successfully obtained a Master's Degree in the field of Film, Video and Media studies with Honours. She's also has been named to the Dean's List Award in recognition of her outstanding scholastic achievement. 

Next,upon her graduation in 2014 she also took an acting course for 6 months at the New York Film Academy in Los Angeles, United States.

Filmography

Film

TV series

Television films

Television

Marriage and issue 
On 30 April 2017, she married His Highness Tengku Shariffuddin Shah Ibni Tengku Sulaiman Shah, one of a senior members of the Selangor royal family. Currently, her husband is 10th in line to the throne of Selangor. 

Upon her marriage she was granted the title of Che’ Puan (equivalent to the English "Lady") as a Prince’s consort that was not of a royal descent. She is styled Yang Berbahagia (The Felicitous). 

Through her marriage, she is also a member of the Royal House of Opu Daeng Celak and are related to notable royal figures, namely:

 The 2nd Yang di-Pertuan Agong, Almarhum Sultan Hisamuddin Alam Shah, husband's paternal great-grandfather.
 The 11th Yang di-Pertuan Agong, Almarhum Sultan Salahuddin Abdul Aziz Shah, husband's paternal grandfather.
 The 8th Yang di-Pertuan Agong, Almarhum Sultan Iskandar, husband's maternal grandfather.
 The 9th and current Sultan of Selangor, Sultan Sharafuddin Idris Shah, husband's paternal uncle
 The 5th and current Sultan of modern Johor, Sultan Ibrahim, husband's maternal uncle.
 The 16th Raja Permaisuri Agong and the 5th Tengku Ampuan of Pahang, Tunku Azizah Aminah Maimunah Iskandariah, husband's maternal aunt.
 The current Raja Muda of Selangor, Tengku Amir Shah, husband's paternal cousin.
 The current Tunku Mahkota of Johor, Tunku Ismail, husband's maternal cousin.
 The current Tengku Mahkota of Pahang, Tengku Hassanal Ibrahim Alam Shah, husband's maternal cousin.

On 13 July 2019, she gave birth to her daughter named Her Highness Tengku Kamiliah Zanariah Josephine Ehsan Shah.

Awards and nominations

References

External links

Living people
1989 births
People from Selangor
Malaysian female models
Malaysian Muslims
Malaysian people of Malay descent
Malaysian people of English descent
21st-century Malaysian actresses